Jennie Gai (born February 25, 2001) is an American badminton player who competes in international level events. She was a gold medalist at the 2018 Summer Youth Olympics and won six titles in the Pan Am Junior Badminton Championships (U11 girls' doubles in 2011; U13 girls' singles, doubles and mixed doubles in 2013; and also U15 girls' singles, and mixed doubles in 2015). She represented her country at the 2016 BWF World Junior Championships.

Achievements

Pan Am Championships 
Women's singles

Women's doubles

Pan Am Junior Championships 
Girls' singles

BWF International Challenge/Series (8 titles, 5 runners-up) 
Women's singles

Women's doubles

Mixed doubles

  BWF International Challenge tournament
  BWF International Series tournament
  BWF Future Series tournament

BWF Junior International (1 title) 
Girls' singles

  BWF Junior International Grand Prix tournament
  BWF Junior International Challenge tournament
  BWF Junior International Series tournament
  BWF Junior Future Series tournament

Notes

References

External links 

 

2001 births
Living people
Sportspeople from Lowell, Massachusetts
People from Fremont, California
American female badminton players
Badminton players at the 2018 Summer Youth Olympics
21st-century American women